Cerastes cerastes, commonly known as the Saharan horned viper or the desert horned viper, is a venomous species of viper native to the deserts of Northern Africa and parts of the Arabian Peninsula and Levant. It is often easily recognized by the presence of a pair of supraocular "horns", although hornless individuals do occur. Three subspecies have been described.

Description 
Females are larger than males.

One of the most distinctive characteristics of this species is the presence of supraorbital "horns", one over each eye. However, these may be reduced in size or absent (see genus Cerastes). The eyes are prominent and set on the sides of the head. There is significant sexual dimorphism, with males having larger heads and larger eyes than females. Compared to C. gasperettii, the relative head size of C. cerastes is larger and there is a greater frequency of horned individuals (13% versus 48%, respectively).

The colour pattern consists of a yellowish, pale grey, pinkish, reddish or pale brown ground colour, which almost always matches the substrate colour where the animal is found. Dorsally, a series of dark, semi-rectangular blotches runs the length of the body. These blotches may or may not be fused into crossbars. The belly is white. The tail, which may have a black tip, is usually thin.

Common names 
Common names of this species include desert sidewinding horned viper, Saharan horned viper, horned s, Sahara horned viper, desert horned viper, North African horned viper, African desert horned viper, greater cerastes, asp and horned viper. In Egypt, it is called el-ṭorîsha; in Libya, it is called um-Goron.

Distribution and habitat 
The snake is common in Iraq but is also found in Syria, Saudi Arabia, Yemen, Jordan, Israel and Kuwait. They can also be found in parts of North Africa including Libya, Egypt, and Sudan.

A member of this species was reportedly found and killed by locals on the border between the Peshawar and Nowshera districts of Khyber Pakhtunkhwa province of Pakistan. The incident was reported along with a photo of the dead reptile in 'Aaj', and Urdu-language newspaper published in the provincial capital Peshawar on September 10, 2019.

Originally, the type locality was listed only as "Oriente." However, Flower (1933) proposed "Egypt" by way of clarification.

These snakes favor dry, sandy areas with sparse rock outcroppings, and tend to avoid coarse sand.

Behavior 
They typically move by sidewinding, during which they press their weight into the sand or soil, leaving whole-body impressions. Often, it is even possible to use these impressions to make ventral scale counts. They have a reasonably placid temperament, but if threatened, they may assume a C-shaped posture and rapidly rub their coils together. Because they have strongly keeled scales, this rubbing produces a rasping noise, similar to the sound produced by snakes of the genus Echis. In the wild, they are typically ambush predators, lying submerged in sand adjacent to rocks or under vegetation. When approached, they strike very rapidly, holding on to the captured prey (small birds and rodents) until the venom takes effect.

Reproduction 
In captivity, mating was observed in April and always occurred while the animals were buried in the sand. This species is oviparous, laying 8–23 eggs that hatch after 50 to 80 days of incubation. The eggs are laid under rocks and in abandoned rodent burrows. The hatchlings measure 12–15 cm (about 5–6 inches) in total length.

Venom 
Cerastes cerastes venom is reported to be similar in action to Echis venom. Envenomation usually causes swelling, haemorrhage, necrosis, nausea, vomiting, and haematuria. A high phospholipase A2 content may cause cardiotoxicity and myotoxicity. Studies of venom from both C. cerastes and C. vipera list a total of eight venom fractions, the most powerful of which has haemorrhagic activity. Venom yields vary, with ranges of 19–27 mg to 100 mg of dried venom being reported. For venom toxicity, Brown (1973) gives  values of 0.4 mg/kg IV and 3.0 mg/kg SC. An estimated lethal dose for humans is 40–50 mg.

Taxonomy 
A number of subspecies have been described:
 Cerastes ceraste hoofieni Werner & Sivan, 1999 – Saudi Arabia.
 Cerastes ceraste karlhartli Sochurek, 1974 – Egyptian horned viper – southeast Egypt and Sinai Peninsula.
 Cerastes ceraste mutila Domergue, 1901 – Algerian horned viper – southwest Algeria, Morocco.

Previously, C. gasperettii was also regarded as a subspecies of C. cerastes.

References

Further reading 

 Boulenger GA. 1896. Catalogue of the Snakes in the British Museum (Natural History). Volume III., Containing the...Viperidæ. London: Trustees of the British Museum (Natural History). (Taylor and Francis, printers). xiv + 727 pp. + Plates I.- XXV. (Cerastes cornutus, pp. 502–503).
 Calmette A. 1907. Les venins, les animaux venimeux et la serotherapie antivenimeuse. In: Bucherl W. editor. 1967. Venomous Animals and Their Venoms. Vol. I. Paris: Masson. 233 pp.
 Mohamed AH, Kamel A, Ayobe MH. 1969. "Studies of phospholipase A and B activities of Egyptian snake venoms and a scorpion venom". Toxicon 6: 293–988.
 Joger U. 1984. The Venomous Snakes of the Near and Middle East. Wiesbaden: Dr. Ludwig Reichert Verlag. 175 pp.
 Labib RS, Malim HY, Farag NW. 1979. "Fractionation of Cerastes cerastes and Cerastes vipera snake venoms by gel filtration and identification of some enzymatic and biological activities". Toxicon 17: 337–345.
 Labib RS, Azab MH, Farag NW. 1981. "Effects of Cerastes cerastes (Egyptian sand viper) snake venoms on blood coagulation: separation of coagulant and anticoagulant factors and their correlation with arginineesterase protease activities". Toxicon 19: 85–94.
 Labib RS, Azab ER, Farag NW. 1981. "Proteases of Cerastes cerastes and Cerastes vipera snake venoms". Toxicon 19: 73–83.
 Linnaeus C. 1758. Systema naturæ per regna tria naturæ, secundum classes, ordines, genera, species, cum characteribus, differentiis, synonymis, locis. Tomus I. Editio Decima, Reformata. Stockholm: L. Salvius. 824 pp. (Coluber cerastes, p. 217).
 Schneemann M, Cathomas R, Laidlaw ST, El Nahas AM, Theakston RDG, Warrell DA. 2004. "Life-threatening envenoming by the Saharan horned viper (Cerastes cerastes) causing micro-angiopathic haemolysis, coagulopathy and acute renal failure: clinical cases and review". Association of Physicians. QJM 97 (11): 717–727. Full text at Oxford Journals. Accessed 9 March 2007.
 Schnurrenburger H. 1959. "Observations on behavior in two Libyan species of viperine snake". Herpetologica 15:70-2.

External links 

 
 Exceptional photo sequence of Cerastes cerastes feeding in the wild at FJ Expeditions taken on 27 October 2004. Accessed 19 October 2013.
 Sand viper page at Plumed-serpent.com. Accessed 30 July 2006.
 . Accessed 31 May 2007.
Aziz Subach, Arik Dorfman, Bar Avidov, Adi Domer, Yehonatan Samocha and Inon Scharf. 2022 Foraging behaviour, habitat use and population size of the desert horned viper in the Negev desert. Royal Society Open Science https://doi.org/10.1098/rsos.220326

Movement ecology and foraging behavior of the Saharan horned viper in the Negev Desert – an outline for research

Viperinae
Reptiles of North Africa
Snakes of Jordan
Reptiles of the Arabian Peninsula
Fauna of the Sahara
Reptiles described in 1758
Taxa named by Carl Linnaeus